The Filmfare Best Male Debut Award is given by the Filmfare magazine as part of its annual Filmfare Awards South for South Indian films. For Tamil films, 11 actors are awarded and for Telugu films, 10 actors are awarded, and for Malayalam films, three actors are awarded.

Recipients

References

General

Specific

Filmfare Awards South
Film awards for male debut actors